The imperial campaigns were a series of campaigns led by Suleiman, who was the tenth and longest-reigning Sultan of the Ottoman Empire.

In 1520, Suleiman became the Sultan at the age of 25, succeeding his father Selim I (who had himself more than doubled the size of the Empire through his own campaigns), and began a series of military conquests. In addition to campaigns led by his viziers and admirals, Suleiman personally led 13 campaigns. The total duration of these campaigns was ten years and three months. The details of the first eight campaigns were preserved in Suleiman's diary. His main opponents were Ferdinand I from the House of Habsburg (later the Holy Roman Emperor), and Tahmasp I of Safavid Persia. Most of Suleiman's campaigns were directed to the west. In 1521 the Ottomans captured Belgrade, which had been besieged unsuccessfully by Mehmed the Conqueror, and in 1526 the Battle of Mohács ended with the defeat of Louis II of Hungary. But Suleiman did not annex most of Hungary till 1541. In 1529  Suleiman's conquests were checked at the siege of Vienna. Although from 1529 to 1566 the borders of the Ottoman Empire moved further west, none of the later campaigns achieved the decisive victory that would secure the new Ottoman possessions. He annexed most of the Near East in his conflict with the Safavids. Under Suleiman's rule, the Ottoman annexed large swathes of North Africa as far west as Algeria, while the Ottoman fleet dominated the Mediterranean Sea.

In January 1566 Suleiman, who had ruled the Ottoman Empire for 46 years, went to war for the last time. Although he was 72 years old and suffered gout to the extent that he was carried on a litter, he nominally commanded his thirteenth military campaign. On 1 May 1566, the Sultan left Constantinople at the head of one of the largest armies he had ever commanded. Nikola Šubić Zrinski's success in an attack upon an Ottoman encampment at Siklós, and as a consequence Suleiman's siege of Szigetvár, blocked Ottoman's line of advance towards Vienna. Although an Ottoman victory, the battle stopped the Ottoman push for Vienna that year, since Suleiman died during the siege.

Usage
The table's columns (except for Notes and Images) are sortable by pressing the arrows symbols. The following gives an overview of what is included in the table and how the sorting works.
#: number of the campaigns which Suleiman personally led. This does not include the campaigns led by his viziers and admirals.
Campaign: name of the campaigns (alternative names for some campaigns are included below the first name)

Campaign dates: time period of campaign with opening and terminal dates of each campaign
Notes: Campaign path which is in small font, describes Suleiman's exact direction in particular campaign. Suleiman's main battle/target is bolded. Below the campaign path there is a short description of the campaign, covering all major events.
Image: presented image is closely related with campaign, usually showing the main battle/target

Campaigns

Suleiman's opponents

See also

 Growth of the Ottoman Empire
 Index of Ottoman Empire-related articles
 List of Ottoman sieges and landings
 Outline of the Ottoman Empire
Ottoman wars in Europe

Notes
Footnotes

Citations

References

Further reading

 
 

Wars involving the Ottoman Empire
Military campaigns involving the Ottoman Empire
Ottoman Empire military-related lists
Suleiman the Magnificent
Ottoman Empire-related lists